Teigen is a former unincorporated community in western Petroleum County, Montana, United States, which stretched along Highway 200, approximately 20 miles west of the county seat, Winnett.  Its elevation was 3,192 feet (973 m). Teigen's post office opened on November 24, 1914, and was closed on December 21, 1983,; the vicinity still has a separate ZIP code of 59084, which is serviced from Winnett Although Teigen still remains marked on many road atlases, including Google Maps, there are no longer any buildings left of the town; only a nearby home remains in proximity.

In 1884, Mons Teigen established a sheep ranch in the area with Knute and Ole Opheim; Teigen acquired sole ownership in 1897. The Milwaukee Land Company platted the Teigen townsite in 1914 and the post office opened the same year.

Climate
According to the Köppen Climate Classification system, Teigen has a semi-arid climate, abbreviated "BSk" on climate maps.

References

Unincorporated communities in Petroleum County, Montana
Unincorporated communities in Montana